Dato' Hajah Sarimah binti Ahmad (Jawi: سريمه أحمد; born on 28 April 1942) is a Singaporean-Malaysian actress most famously known for her work in various black-and-white Malay films of the 1960s and 1970s including Ibu Mertua-ku and Madu Tiga.

Filmography

Film

Television series

Telemovie

Awards and nominations
 2nd Malaysia Film Festival, 1981: Best Actress for Dia Ibuku (She's My Mother)

References

External links
 

1942 births
Living people
Malaysian film actresses
People from Pahang
20th-century Malaysian actresses
Malay Film Productions contract players